John Kelton (25 July 1937 – 17 December 2012) was an  Australian rules footballer who played with South Melbourne in the Victorian Football League (VFL).

Notes

External links 

1937 births
2012 deaths
Australian rules footballers from Victoria (Australia)
Sydney Swans players